Welburn may refer to:

Places
Welburn, Derwent, near Malton in Ryedale district, North Yorkshire, England
Welburn, Kirkbymoorside, near Kirkbymoorside in Ryedale district, North Yorkshire, England

People with the surname
Edward T. Welburn (born 1950), American automobile designer
Ken Welburn (born 1929), English rugby league player

See also
Welbourn (disambiguation)